Monty Scott is a Canadian stand-up comedian. He is most noted for his 2019 comedy album The Abyss Stares Back, which received a Juno Award nomination for Comedy Album of the Year at the Juno Awards of 2020. The album was inspired in part by his recovery from a 2018 injury caused by falling down the steps to his basement apartment. Scott spent two days in a coma following the fall.

Scott is an original member of Comedy Records' Roster and was featured on the label's 10 Year Anniversary Album.

See also
List of Canadian stand-up comedians

References

1973 births
Living people
Canadian stand-up comedians
Canadian male comedians
Comedians from Toronto
People from Scarborough, Toronto
Black Canadian comedians
Canadian people of Guyanese descent
21st-century Canadian comedians